Magnolia lotungensis (syn. Parakmeria lotungensis), the eastern joy lotus tree, is a species of flowering plant in the family Magnoliaceae, native to southern China, including Hainan. It is used as a street tree in a number of southern Chinese cities. Due to its strength, easy maintenance, narrow growth habit with a rounded crown, and cold hardiness, it is showing promise as an ornamental tree in North America and Europe.

References

lotungensis
Trees of China
Endemic flora of China
Flora of South-Central China
Flora of Southeast China
Flora of Hainan
Plants described in 1963